Three-time defending champion Björn Borg successfully defended his title, defeating Ivan Lendl in the final, 6–1, 4–6, 6–2, 3–6, 6–1 to win the men's singles tennis title at the 1981 French Open. It was his sixth and last French Open title.

Seeds
The seeded players are listed below. Björn Borg is the champion; others show the round in which they were eliminated.

  Björn Borg (champion)
  Jimmy Connors (quarterfinals)
  John McEnroe (quarterfinals)
  Gene Mayer (third round)
  Ivan Lendl (final)
  Guillermo Vilas (fourth round)
  José Luis Clerc (semifinals)
  Harold Solomon (first round)
  Vitas Gerulaitis (first round)
  Eliot Teltscher (first round)
  Yannick Noah (quarterfinals)
  Brian Gottfried (third round)
  Peter McNamara (fourth round)
  Wojtek Fibak (fourth round)
  Balázs Taróczy (quarterfinals)
  Eddie Dibbs (third round)

Draw

Key
 Q = Qualifier
 WC = Wild card
 LL = Lucky loser
 r = Retired

Finals

Section 1

Section 2

Section 3

Section 4

Section 5

Section 6

Section 7

Section 8

External links
 Association of Tennis Professionals (ATP) – 1981 French Open Men's Singles draw
1981 French Open – Men's draws and results at the International Tennis Federation

Men's Singles
French Open by year – Men's singles
1981 Grand Prix (tennis)